The CenTex Barracudas (also known as the Central Texas Barracudas) was a professional indoor football team based out of Belton, Texas. They competed in the Intense Football League. They played their home games at Bell County Expo Center.

They began their history in 2006 as an expansion team in the Intense Football League. They went 8-6 in their first season, but lost in the semifinals to Corpus Christi. In 2007, the team finished 2-12, just avoiding last place. Their 2008 campaign started off shaky, but then the team added former Texas Longhorn quarterback James Brown, who helped lead the Cudas to their second playoff appearance and first playoff win, against Alaska. CenTex then faced Corpus Christi in the semifinal once again, and lost.

After the 2008 season, owner/president Dr. Frederick Barnett sought financial partners to keep the team afloat. Finding none locally based, the team eventually folded.

Season-by-season 

|-
| colspan="6" align="center" | CenTex Barracudas (Intense Football League)
|-
|2006 || 8 || 6 || 0 || 3rd League || Lost Semifinal (Corpus Christi)
|-
|2007 || 2 || 12 || 0 || 7th League || --
|-
|2008 || 8 || 6 || 0 || 3rd League || Won Round 1 (Alaska)Lost Semifinal (Corpus Christi)
|-
!Totals || 19 || 26 || 0
|colspan="2"| (including playoffs)

External links 
 Main Site of the CenTex Barracudas

Intense Football League teams
American football teams in Texas
Defunct American football teams in Texas
Bell County, Texas
2005 establishments in Texas
2008 disestablishments in Texas
American football teams established in 2005
American football teams disestablished in 2008